Rumy  is a village in the administrative district of Gmina Dźwierzuty, within Szczytno County, Warmian-Masurian Voivodeship, in northern Poland.

During the period from 1938 to 1945, Nazi Germany used the name "Rumnau" for the village.

References

Rumy